The Mathematical Association of America (MAA) is a professional society that focuses on mathematics accessible at the undergraduate level. Members include university, college, and high school teachers; graduate and undergraduate students; pure and applied mathematicians; computer scientists; statisticians; and many others in academia, government, business, and industry.

The MAA was founded in 1915 and is headquartered at 1529 18th Street, Northwest in the Dupont Circle neighborhood of Washington, D.C. The organization publishes mathematics journals and books, including the American Mathematical Monthly (established in 1894 by Benjamin Finkel), the most widely read mathematics journal in the world according to records on JSTOR.

Mission and Vision
The mission of the MAA is to advance the understanding of mathematics and its impact on our world.

We envision a society that values the power and beauty of mathematics and fully realizes its potential to promote human flourishing.

Meetings
The MAA sponsors the annual summer MathFest and cosponsors with the American Mathematical Society the Joint Mathematics Meeting, held in early January of each year. On occasion the Society for Industrial and Applied Mathematics joins in these meetings.  Twenty-nine regional sections also hold regular meetings.

Publications
The association publishes multiple journals in partnership with Taylor & Francis:
 The American Mathematical Monthly is expository, aimed at a broad audience from undergraduate students to research mathematicians.
 Mathematics Magazine is expository, aimed at teachers of undergraduate mathematics, especially at the junior-senior level.
 The College Mathematics Journal is expository, aimed at teachers of undergraduate mathematics, especially at the freshman-sophomore level.
 Math Horizons is expository, aimed at undergraduate students.

MAA FOCUS is the association member newsletter. The Association publishes an online resource, Mathematical Sciences Digital Library (Math DL). The service launched in 2001 with the online-only Journal of Online Mathematics and its Applications (JOMA) and a set of classroom tools, Digital Classroom Resources. These were followed in 2004 by Convergence, an online-only history magazine, and in 2005 by MAA Reviews, an online book review service,  and Classroom Capsules and Notes, a set of classroom notes.

Competitions
The MAA sponsors numerous competitions for students, including the William Lowell Putnam Competition for undergraduate students, the online competition series, and the American Mathematics Competitions (AMC) for middle- and high-school students.  This series of competitions is as follows:
 AMC 8: 25 multiple choice questions in 40 minutes
AMC 10/AMC 12: 25 multiple choice questions in 75 minutes
AIME: 15 short answer questions in a 3-hour period
USAMO/USAJMO: 6 question, 2 day, 9 hour, proof-based olympiad

Through this program, outstanding students are identified and invited to participate in the Mathematical Olympiad Program. Ultimately, six high school students are chosen to represent the U.S. at the International Mathematics Olympiad.

Sections
The MAA is composed of the following twenty-nine regional sections:

Allegheny Mountain, EPADEL, Florida, Illinois, Indiana, Intermountain, Iowa, Kansas, Kentucky, Louisiana/Mississippi, MD-DC-VA, Metro New York, Michigan, Missouri, Nebraska – SE SD, New Jersey, North Central, Northeastern, Northern CA – NV-HI, Ohio, Oklahoma-Arkansas, Pacific Northwest, Rocky Mountain, Seaway, Southeastern, Southern CA – NV, Southwestern, Texas, Wisconsin

Special Interest Groups
There are seventeen Special Interest Groups of the Mathematical Association of America (SIGMAAs).  These SIGMAAs were established to advance the MAA mission by supporting groups with a common mathematical interest, and facilitating interaction between such groups and the greater mathematics community.

 Mathematics and the Arts
 Business, Industry, Government
 Mathematical and Computational Biology
 Environmental Mathematics
 History of Mathematics
 Inquiry-Based Learning
 Math Circles for Students and Teachers
 Mathematical Knowledge for Teaching
 Philosophy of Mathematics
 Quantitative Literacy
 Recreational Mathematics
 Research in Undergraduate Mathematics Education
 Mathematics and Sports
 Statistics Education
 Teaching Advanced High School Mathematics
 Undergraduate Research
 Mathematics Instruction Using the WEB

Awards and prizes
The MAA distributes many prizes, including the Chauvenet Prize and the Carl B. Allendoerfer Award, Trevor Evans Award, Lester R. Ford Award, George Pólya Award, Merten M. Hasse Prize, Henry L. Alder Award, Euler Book Prize awards, the Yueh-Gin Gung and Dr. Charles Y. Hu Award for Distinguished Service to Mathematics, and Beckenbach Book Prize.

Memberships

The MAA is one of four partners in the Joint Policy Board for Mathematics (JPBM), and participates in the Conference Board of the Mathematical Sciences (CBMS), an umbrella organization of sixteen professional societies.

Historical accounts
In addition numerous regional sections of the MAA have published accounts of their local history.
The MAA was established in 1915. But the roots of the Association can be traced to the 1894 founding of the American Mathematical Monthly by Benjamin Finkel, who wrote "Most of our existing journals deal almost exclusively with subjects beyond the reach of the average student or teacher of mathematics or at least with subjects with which they are familiar, and little, if any, space, is devoted to the solution of problems…No pains will be spared on the part of the Editors to make this the most interesting and most popular journal published in America."

Inclusiveness

The MAA has for a long time followed a strict policy of inclusiveness and non-discrimination.

In previous periods it was subject to the same problems of discrimination that were widespread across the United States. One notorious incident at a south-eastern sectional meeting in Nashville in 1951 has been documented by the American mathematician and equal rights activist Lee Lorch, who in 2007
received the most prestigious award given by the MAA (the Yueh-Gin Gung and Dr. Charles Y. Hu Award for Distinguished Service to Mathematics). The citation delivered at the 2007 MAA awards presentation, where Lorch received a standing ovation, recorded that:

"Lee Lorch, the chair of the mathematics department at Fisk University, and three Black colleagues, Evelyn Boyd (now Granville), Walter Brown, and H. M. Holloway came to the meeting and were able to attend the scientific sessions. However, the organizer for the closing banquet refused to honor the reservations of these four mathematicians. (Letters in Science, August 10, 1951, pp. 161–162 spell out the details). Lorch and his colleagues wrote to the governing bodies of the AMS and MAA seeking bylaws against discrimination. Bylaws were not changed, but non-discriminatory policies were established and have been strictly observed since then."

The Association's first woman president was Dorothy Lewis Bernstein (1979–1980).

MAA Carriage House

The Carriage House that belonged to the residents at 1529 18th Street, N.W. dates to around 1900.  It is older than the 5-story townhouse where the MAA Headquarters is currently located, which was completed in 1903.  Charles Evans Hughes occupied the house while he was Secretary of State (1921–1925) and a Supreme Court Justice (1910–1916 and 1930–1941).

The Carriage House would have been used by the owners as a livery stable to house the family carriage, though little else is known about its history today.  There are huge doors that were once used as an entrance for horses and carriages.  Iron rings used to tie up horses can still be seen on an adjacent building.  The Carriage House would have perhaps also been used as living quarters for a coachman, as was typical for the time period.

Presidents
The presidents of the MAA:

1916 Earl R Hedrick
1917 Florian Cajori
1918 Edward V Huntington
1919 Herbert Ellsworth Slaught
1920 David Eugene Smith
1921 George A Miller
1922 Raymond C Archibald
1923 Robert D Carmichael
1924 Harold L Reitz
1925 Julian L Coolidge
1926 Dunham Jackson
1927–1928 Walter B Ford
1929–1930 John W Young
1931–1932 Eric T Bell
1933–1934 Arnold Dresden
1935–1936 David R Curtiss
1937–1938 Aubrey J Kempner
1939–1940 William B Carver
1941–1942 Raymond Woodard Brink
1943–1944 William D Cairns
1945–1946 Cyrus C MacDuffee
1947–1948 Lester R Ford
1949–1950 Rudolph E Langer
1951–1952 Saunders Mac Lane
1953–1954 Edward J McShane
1955–1956 William L Duren, Jr
1957–1958 G Baley Price
1959–1960 Carl B Allendoerfer
1961–1962 Albert W Tucker
1963–1964 R H Bing
1965–1966 Raymond L Wilder
1967–1968 Edwin E Moise
1969–1970 Gail S Young
1971–1972 Victor Klee
1973–1974 Ralph P Boas
1975–1976 Henry O Pollak
1977–1978 Henry L Alder
1979–1980 Dorothy L Bernstein
1981–1982 Richard D Anderson
1983–1984 Ivan Niven
1985–1986 Lynn A Steen
1987–1988 Leonard Gillman
1989–1990 Lida K Barrett
1991–1992 Deborah Tepper Haimo
1993–1994 Donald L Kreider
1995–1996 Kenneth A Ross
1997–1998 Gerald L Alexanderson
1999–2000 Thomas F Banchoff
2001–2002 Ann E. Watkins
2003–2004 Ronald L Graham
2005–2006 Carl C Cowen
2007–2008 Joseph A Gallian
2009–2010 David M Bressoud
2011–2012 Paul M Zorn
2013–2014 Bob Devaney
2015–2016 Francis E. Su
2017–2018 Deanna Haunsperger
2019–2020 Michael Dorff
2021-2022 Jennifer Quinn

See also
American Mathematical Association of Two-Year Colleges
American Mathematical Society
National Council of Teachers of Mathematics
Society for Industrial and Applied Mathematics

Notes

References

, talk by Lee Lorch at AMS Special Session, Cincinnati, January 1994.

 (includes citation for Lee Lorch)

External links

MAA official website
A Guide to the Mathematical Association of America Records, 1916–present: Homepage
Mathematical Sciences Digital Library (MathDL)
Convergence, the MAA's Math History and Math Education Magazine (part of MathDL)

 
Mathematics education in the United States
Education-related professional associations
Educational organizations based in the United States
Professional associations based in the United States
Dupont Circle
Mathematical societies
Organizations based in Washington, D.C.
Organizations established in 1915
1915 establishments in the United States